Charles Martel (8 September 1271 – 12 August 1295) of the Capetian dynasty was the eldest son of king Charles II of Naples and Mary of Hungary, the daughter of King Stephen V of Hungary.

The 18-year-old Charles Martel was set up by Pope Nicholas IV and the ecclesiastical party as the titular King of Hungary (1290–1295) as the successor of his maternal uncle, the childless Ladislaus IV of Hungary against whom the Pope had already earlier declared a crusade.

He never managed to govern the Kingdom of Hungary, where an agnate of the Árpád dynasty, his cousin Andrew III of Hungary ruled at that time.  Charles Martel was, however, successful in asserting his claim in the Kingdom of Croatia, then in personal union with Hungary.

Charles Martel died of the plague in Naples. His son, Charles (or Charles Robert), later succeeded in winning the throne of Hungary.

Charles was known personally to Dante: in the Divine Comedy, the poet speaks warmly of and to Charles's spirit when they meet in the Heaven of Venus (in Paradiso VIII).

Family
He married Clemence of Habsburg (d. 1295), daughter of Rudolph I, King of Germany.

They had three children:
 Charles I of Hungary (1288–1342), King of Hungary
 Beatrix (1290–1354, Grenoble), married on 25 May 1296 Jean II de La Tour du Pin, Dauphin du Viennois
 Clementia (February 1293 – 12 October 1328, Paris), married near Troyes on 31 August 1315 Louis X of France

Ancestry

References

Sources

Further reading 
  Coat of arms of the House of Anjou-Sicily on the French Wikipedia
  House of Anjou-Sicily on the French Wikipedia

|-

1271 births
1295 deaths
Princes of Salerno
House of Anjou-Hungary
Pretenders to the Hungarian throne
Italian people of French descent
Italian people of Hungarian descent
Italian people of Spanish descent
Sons of kings
13th-century Neapolitan people
Heirs apparent who never acceded